The fifth season of the Greek Cypriot reality talent show The Voice of Greece premiered on October 2, 2018 on Skai TV. Based on the reality singing competition The Voice of Holland, the series was created by Dutch television producer John de Mol. It is part of an international series.

On September 19, 2017, Skai TV confirmed that the presenter, the backstage host and the coaches of the previous season would return.

Lemonia Beza is the winner of the season from Team Kostis Maraveyas.

Selection process
The Pre-Auditions or Pre-Casting begins from Thessaloniki and ended in Athens.

Teams
Color key

Blind auditions 
A new feature within the Blind Auditions this season is the Block, which each coach can use four time to prevent one of the other coaches from getting a contestant.

Blind Auditions began filming on September 26, 2018. The episodes began airing on October 2, 2018, being broadcast every Tuesday, Wednesday and Thursday on Skai TV and Sigma TV.

Color key

Episode 1 (October 2) 
The first blind audition episode was broadcast on October 2, 2018.

Episode 2 (October 3) 
The second blind audition episode was broadcast on October 3, 2018.

Episode 3 (October 9) 
The third blind audition episode was broadcast on October 9, 2018.

Episode 4 (October 10) 
The fourth blind audition episode was broadcast on October 10, 2018.

Episode 5 (October 11) 
The fifth blind audition episode was broadcast on October 11, 2018.

^1: Kostis tried to block Panos, but Elena pressed it before him.

Episode 6 (October 16) 
The sixth blind audition episode was broadcast on October 16, 2018.

Episode 7 (October 17) 
The seventh blind audition episode was broadcast on October 17, 2018.

Episode 8 (October 18) 
The eighth blind audition episode was broadcast on October 18, 2018.

Episode 9 (October 23) 
The ninth blind audition episode was broadcast on October 23, 2018.

Episode 10 (October 24) 
The tenth blind audition episode was broadcast on October 24, 2018.

Episode 11 (October 25) 
The eleventh blind audition episode was broadcast on October 25, 2018.

Episode 12 (October 30) 
The twelfth blind audition episode was broadcast on October 30, 2018.

Episode 13 (October 31) 
The thirteenth blind audition episode was broadcast on October 31, 2018.

Episode 14 (November 1) 
The fourteenth blind audition episode was broadcast on November 1, 2018.

Episode 15 (November 6) 
The fifteenth blind audition episode was broadcast on November 6, 2018.

Episode 16 (November 7) 
The sixteenth blind audition episode was broadcast on November 7, 2018.

Episode 17 (November 8) 
The seventeenth blind audition episode was broadcast on November 8, 2018.

Notes

Battle rounds

The Battle Rounds started on November 13, 2018. After announcing Danai Mastoraki's withdrawal from the competition, Sakis Rouvas grouped three of his team members into one battle, in which two contestants from the trio advanced, with the third eliminated. After announcing Konstantina Metaxa's withdrawal from the competition, Helena Paparizou grouped three of her team members into one battle, in which two contestants from the trio advanced, with the third eliminated. After announcing Giannis Skamnakis's withdrawal from the competition, Kostis Maraveyas grouped three of his team members into one battle, in which two contestants from the trio advanced, with the third eliminated. The coaches can steal two losing artists from other coaches. Contestants who win their battle or are stolen by another coach will advance to the Knockout rounds.

Colour key

Knockouts
The knockouts started on November 27, 2018. The coaches can each steal one losing artist from another team. Contestants who win their knockout or are stolen by another coach will advance to the Live Shows.

Colour key

Playoffs
The playoffs started on December 4, 2018. In the extra episode of The Voice of Greece, the coaches can bring 4 players that eliminated in the Battles or in the Knockouts and will give their best to convince their coach that they have to go to Live Shows. Only one of each team will go to Lives and so every coach will have 9 and not 8 players in their teams.

Color key
 – Contestant was eliminated 
 – Contestant was advanced to the Live Shows

Live shows

Results summary 
Color key
Artist's info

Result details

Live show details
The live shows took place in the Galatsi Olympic Hall in Galatsi, Attica.
Color key

Week 1

Cross Battle 1 (December 5)

Cross Battle 2 (December 6)

Week 2

Semi-Final 1 (December 11)

Semi-Final 2 (December 12)

Week 3

Final (December 20)

Ratings 

Note

  Outside top 20.

References

External links
 

Season 5
Voice of Greece 2018